Snezhana Kurgambaeva (born 1990) is a team handball player from Kazakhstan. She plays on the Kazakhstan women's national handball team, and participated at the 2011 World Women's Handball Championship in Brazil.

References

1990 births
Living people
Kazakhstani female handball players
20th-century Kazakhstani women
21st-century Kazakhstani women